Serbin may refer to
Serbin, Texas,  an unincorporated community in the United States
Serbin Fashions, a defunct American clothing company
Serbin Open, a golf tournament on the LPGA Tour played from 1953 to 1957
Serbin (surname)

See also
Serbian (disambiguation)